Archiveus is a computer virus for Microsoft Windows operating systems that is used as a method of extortion.

It is a Trojan horse-type ransomware virus that encrypts the user's files. The user must then purchase something on specific Web sites to obtain the password to decrypt the files.

In May 2006, the password protection was cracked. The password for restoring the affected files was found to be "mf2lro8sw03ufvnsq034jfowr18f3cszc20vmw".

References

External links 
 Virus information by Symantec

Windows file viruses